The Lancaster/Morecambe Built-up area is an urban area which comprises the city of Lancaster and the towns of Morecambe and Heysham in Lancashire, England. The urban area covers an area which has a population of 97,150. The urban area includes the suburbs of both Lancaster and Morecambe. It has three subdivisions: Heysham, Lancaster and Morecambe.

The area covers part of the City of Lancaster District. The area does not include the town of Carnforth or the villages of Hest Bank, Halton, Aldcliffe and Bailrigg (the campus of Lancaster University). As recorded in the 2011 census, the gender make up of the urban area was 46,716 males and 50,434 females, and the ethnic makeup was over 96% white, 1% mixed race, 2% Asian and 0.5% black. The religious make up of the urban area was 65% Christian, 25% non-religious and 2% Muslim. Other religions were under 1%.

References

External links
 
 
 

Lancaster, Lancashire
Morecambe
Urban areas of England